Judith Peck is an American artist (born 1957 in Brooklyn, New York) currently residing in the Greater Washington, D.C. area who is predominantly known for her allegorical figurative oil paintings.

Early life and education 
Peck was born in 1957 in Brooklyn, New York.  She studied art at George Washington University in Washington, D.C., and received a BFA in 1979.

Artwork 
Judith Peck was described by Professional Artist magazine as an "allegorical figurative artist who has made her life’s work to paint about history and healing, using a variety of methods and experimental techniques to achieve a diverse range of visual and tactile results that validate a strong narrative."

Her paintings have been exhibited nationwide and internationally including at the Alexandria Museum of Art in Alexandria, Louisiana, the Masur Museum of Art in Monroe, Louisiana, the Washington County Museum of Fine Arts in Hagerstown, Maryland, the Koehnline Museum of Art, Des Plaines, Illinois, Fresno Art Museum, in Fresno, California, the Portsmouth  Museum, in Portsmouth, Virginia, New Britain Museum of American Art, CT, Virginia Museum of Contemporary Art, and others. Her artwork has also been selected for multiple awards, including the 2019 Best in Show at the Washington County Museum of Art exhibition, the 2018 Phil Desind Award during the Midyear Exhibition at the Butler Institute of American Art and the 2016 Best in Show award at the Pinnacle Exhibition at Florida A&M University Foster-Tanner Fine Arts Gallery. She has also been awarded a Strauss Fellowship Grant from Fairfax County, Virginia.

Her work has been described as "ethereal portrait paintings" by The Washington Post, and in writing about her work Penn State News noted that "She portrays the broken yet beautiful human experience in her oil paintings." In highlighting her work in a 1997 five person show at the Platt Gallery in Los Angeles, the Los Angeles Times art critic noted that Peck's works in the show were "the most emotionally charged art here, portraying 'persecuted Jews from the diaspora.' In her paintings, Hebrew characters appear, like an omniscient force, atop portraits of melancholic faces. In 'Last Covenant,' the letters drip blood over the sunken-eyed face of a woman."

In 2019, for her most recent show at The Gallery at the Pennsylvania College of Technology, she stated that  "I’m not painting the other, I’m painting everyone and we all live in the world together and we are responsible for everyone, each other..." In 2021 she was one of the artists invited to The Phillips Collection's juried invitational, Inside Outside, Upside Down exhibition, a show that was described by The Washington City Paper art critic as forcing "us to remember a time that left us 'confused, battered, and disoriented' through the eyes of 64 D.C.-area artists."

Solo exhibitions 
1999  Dadian Gallery, Wesley Theological Seminary, Washington, DC

1999  Swords into Plowshares Gallery, Detroit, MI

2002  Intercultural Museum, Baltimore, MD

2010  International Arts and Artists’ Hillyer Art Space, Washington, DC

2011  Meyer Metro Gallery, Bellaire, TX

2012  Hoyt Institute for the Arts, New Castle, PA

2013  Gallery 65, McLean, VA

2015  Chelsea Underground Art Gallery, Chelsea, MI

2017  Hill Center Gallery, Washington, DC

2016  Artists and Makers 2, Rockville, MD

2018  The Gallery at Penn College, Pennsylvania College of Technology, PA

Awards 
Peck is a four-time award winner of the District of Columbia Commission on the Arts and Humanities purchase awards for the permanent collection of the city of Washington, DC, and also a purchase award from the Alexandria Commission for the Arts for the permanent collection of the city of Alexandria, Virginia.

2011  Strauss Fellowship Grant from Fairfax County, VA

Juror's Choice Award - About Face. Annmarie Sculpture Garden & Art Center, Solomons, MD

2012  Best in Show - In The Flesh III, Target Gallery, Alexandria, VA

2013  Juror's Award - Masur Museum of Art, Monroe, LA

2014  Awarded Brush Creek Residency, Saratoga, WY

2016  Best in Show winner - Pinnacle - Florida A&M University Foster-Tanner Fine Arts Gallery, Tallahassee, FL

Second Place - Emulsion 2016 - East City Art - Cataloged - Washington, DC

At the Walker exhibition - Cataloged - The Walker Art Collection, Garnett, KS

Awarded - International Artist-in-Residence Hallein Kunstinsel Program, Salzburg, Austria

Second Place - Figurative National Juried Competition, Lore Degenstein Gallery, Susquehanna University, Selinsgrove, PA

2017  Best in Show Award plus Students’ Choice Award - Art Speaks on the Bay, Mathews, VA

Second Place Award - Regional Exhibition, Hill Center Gallery, Washington, DC

First Place - For & About Women, Frederick Gallery, Fredericksburg Center for the Creative Arts, Fredericksburg, VA

Second Place Award - 30 September International Competition, Alexandria Museum of Art, Alexandria, LA

2018  Phil Desind Award - National Midyear Exhibition - Butler Institute of American Art

2019  Best in Show - Washington County Museum of Art, Hagerstown, MD

Publications 
The Ashen Rainbow : Essays on the Arts and the Holocaust, Ori Z. Soltes, Bartleby Press: Silver Spring, MD 

Q and A, PoetsArtists Magazine Feb 2011 Volume 4 Issue 1

Collaboration Issue, PoetsArtists Magazine issue 3 July 2011

Gaze of the Beholder, American Art Collector Magazine, December 2011, Issue 74

Featured in the Birmingham Arts Journal, Volume 9, Issue 1, 2012

Artists and Their Models PoetsArtists Issue 38 Sept 2012

Depth Perception, The Artist’s Magazine, October 2012

Bourgeon: Fifty Artists Write About Their Work, Robert Bettmann (Editor) Day Eight (2013) 

Heroes and Villains Issue, PoetsArtists Magazine, May 2013

Cover and feature article Elan Magazine, December 2013

Kress Project, Georgia Museum of Art, 2013, Lynn Boland (author) 

Feature Article, Catapult Magazine, 2013 Issue 24.

Cracked and Broken, American Art Collector Magazine,  Jan. 2014 Issue 99

Interview PoetsArtists Magazine Issue 52 Feb. 2014

Collaborative project with poet Edward Nudelman, PoetsArtists Magazine issue 50, 2014

The Portrait Issue PA Magazine feature, Issue 72 January 2016

Tradition and Transformation: Three Millennia of Jewish Art and Architecture, Ori Z. Soltes, Canal Street Studios, 2016 

50 Memorable Painters, PoetsArtists Magazine, December 2016

Series Catalogue, Judith Peck, PoetsArtists Magazine, 2017

The Reachable Shore, American Art Collector Magazine, Issue 135 Jan 2017

Sight Unseen, PoetsArtists Magazine, Feb. 2017 Issue 81

Idiosyncratic Monochromes PoetsArtists Magazine Issue 85, June 2017

Hill Rag magazine, October 2017

50 Great Figurative Artworks, PoetsArtists Magazine #89, Dec. 2017

Permanent collections 
Museo Arte Contemporanea, Sicily, Italy

Southern Alleghenies Museum of Art, Altoona, PA

City of Washington, DC

Pennsylvania College of Technology, Williamsport, PA

Susquehanna University, Selinsgrove, PA

City of Alexandria, VA

References

External links 
 Judith Peck Website

Living people
Artists from Washington, D.C.
Jewish American artists
Jewish women artists
George Washington University alumni
Artists from Virginia
Painters from Washington, D.C.
Painters from Virginia
21st-century American women artists
20th-century American women artists
1957 births
Artists from Brooklyn
American women painters